Pasqual Coco (born September 24, 1977) is a former pitcher in Major League Baseball.

Pitching style
Coco was known for throwing a 90–92 mph fastball and an 81–83 mph lively palmball.

References

External links

1977 births
Living people
Acereros de Monclova players
Cafeteros de Córdoba players
Dominican Republic expatriate baseball players in Canada
Dominican Republic expatriate baseball players in Mexico
Dominican Republic expatriate baseball players in the United States
Dorados de Chihuahua players
Dunedin Blue Jays players
Edmonton Trappers players
Hagerstown Suns players
Indianapolis Indians players

Leones del Escogido players
Major League Baseball pitchers
Major League Baseball players from the Dominican Republic
Mexican League baseball pitchers
Pericos de Puebla players
Rojos del Águila de Veracruz players
Saraperos de Saltillo players
Sportspeople from Santo Domingo
St. Catharines Stompers players
Syracuse SkyChiefs players
Tennessee Smokies players
Toronto Blue Jays players